California's 20th State Senate district is one of 40 California State Senate districts. It is currently represented by Democrat Caroline Menjivar.

District profile 
The district encompasses parts of the Inland Empire and Pomona Valley. The district connects the San Gabriel Valley to the desert communities in the east.

Los Angeles County – 1.5%
 Pomona

San Bernardino County – 38.6%
 Chino
 Colton
 Fontana
 Grand Terrace
 Montclair
 Ontario
 Rialto
 San Bernardino – 32.0%

Election results from statewide races

List of senators 
Due to redistricting, the 20th district has been moved around different parts of the state. The current iteration resulted from the 2011 redistricting by the California Citizens Redistricting Commission.

Election results 1994 - present

2018

2014

2010

2006

2002

1998

1994

See also 
 California State Senate
 California State Senate districts
 Districts in California

References

External links 
 District map from the California Citizens Redistricting Commission

20
Government of Los Angeles County, California
Government of San Bernardino County, California
Chino, California
Colton, California
Fontana, California
Montclair, California
Ontario, California
Pomona, California
Rialto, California
San Bernardino, California
Pomona Valley
Inland Empire